Mustapha Kheiraoui (born 7 October 1995) is an Algerian footballer who plays for NA Hussein Dey in the Algerian Ligue Professionnelle 1.

Career 
In 2019, He signed a contract with USM Alger.
In 2020, He signed a contract with USM Bel Abbès.

References

External links
 

1995 births
Living people
Algerian footballers
Association football defenders
Amal Bou Saâda players
USM Alger players
USM Bel Abbès players
21st-century Algerian people